United States Olympic team may refer to:

United States at the Olympics
United States at the Summer Olympics
United States at the Winter Olympics
United States Olympic & Paralympic Committee, the National Olympic Committee and the National Paralympic Committee for the United States